Elisabeth of Brandenburg (24 August 1510 – 25 May 1558) was a Duchess consort of Brunswick-Göttingen-Calenberg by marriage to Eric I, Duke of Brunswick-Lüneburg, and Regent of the Duchy of Brunswick-Göttingen-Calenberg during the minority of her son, Eric II, Duke of Brunswick-Lüneburg, from 1540 until 1545. She is considered a "Reformation Princess", who, together with the Hessian reformer Anton Corvinus, helped the Reformation prevail in today's South Lower Saxony.

Life and work

Early years (1510–1525) 
Elisabeth was born, probably in Cölln, the third child and second daughter of the Elector Joachim I of Brandenburg and his wife Elisabeth, daughter of King John I of Denmark.  She was educated in a strictly religious and humanist fashion.

At the age of not quite 15, she married on 7 July 1525 in Stettin with the forty years old widower Duke Eric I "the Elder" of Brunswick-Göttingen-Calenberg.

She first came into contact with the Reformation in 1527 at her parental court in Brandenburg when her mother celebrated communion under both kinds and thus openly accepted the teachings of Martin Luther,  Her father reacted violently, fearing her mother would convert to "Protestantism", and removed the reformers from Wittenberg, who tried to intervene on behalf of the Electress, from his court.  This event may well have impressed the seventeen-year-old princess deeply, and reinforced her sympathy for the new faith.

Marriage to Eric I (1525–1540) 

Despite the age difference, it was obviously a marriage without insurmountable conflicts, perhaps because Eric mostly stayed on his Erichsburg and Calenberg Castle, while Elisabeth resided at her wittum Münden.

Nevertheless, the marriage was not without blemish.  For example, in 1528, Elisabeth accused Anna von Rumschottel, a member of the landed gentry and for many years her husband's mistress, of being responsible for complications during her second pregnancy.  She accused Anna of witchcraft and urged her husband to have Anna burned at the stake.  Elisabeth also sent her own spies and soldiers into the neighboring Diocese of Minden, in order to arrest Anna in her hideout in Minden.  However, Anna escaped.  During Inquisition proceedings against Anna's alleged helpers, some of the accused women died after torture at the stake.  Elisabeth managed to force Eric into giving her a more profitable wittum than their marriage contract required: instead of the district of Calenberg in the Unterwald region, which contained Calenberg Castle, Neustadt and Hanover and provided little revenue, she received Oberwald, with the towns of Münden, Northeim and Göttingen, which provided more revenue and greater political weight.  Her pregnancy ended with the birth of a healthy male baby, who grew up to be Eric's successor Eric II of Brunswick-Göttingen-Calenberg.  After his birth, this dark chapter was soon forgotten.

When Elisabeth visited her mother at Lichtenburg Castle in 1534, she met Martin Luther personally for the first time.  She began to regularly correspond with him in 1538.  She sent him cheese and wine and he sent her mulberries and fig tree seedlings and his German Bible translation with a personal dedication.

On 7 April, Elisabeth publicly accepted communion under both kinds and thereby expressed her conversion to the Lutheran faith.  On October 6, she informed Landgrave Philip I of Hesse of her conversion and with his assistance, invited the reformer Anton Corvinus to move from nearby Witzenhausen to Münden.  Eric I tolerated the conversion.  Although Lutheranism was inconsistent with his Catholic upbringing and his loyalty to the Emperor, he admired the reformer's courage.

Regency and Reformation (1540–1545) 

Elisabeth had a strong ally in Elector John Frederick I of Saxony.  When Eric I died on 30 July 1540, he helped her become co-regent of Brunswick-Calenberg-Göttingen, together with Philip I of Hesse, despite fierce resistance from Duke Henry II of Brunswick-Wolfenbüttel.  She and Philip were regents for five years; she used this opportunity to implement the Reformation in the principality and to reorganize the princely household.

Anton Corvinus was appointed superintendent of the principality, with an office in Pattensen.  The lawyer Justus von Waldhausen, who had studied at Wittenberg, was appointed to princely Councillor and later to chancellor, on the recommendation of Martin Luther. The physician Burckard Mithoff, the court judge Justin Gobler and Heinrich Campe MJ completed the team with which the princess wanted to implement her reforms.

In 1542, a Church Order for all of Calenberg-Göttingen was issued.  This was followed up by a thorough visitation from 17 November 1542 to 30 April 1543, which Elisabeth personally participated in.  A monastic order issued 4 November 1542 regulated the conversion of the monasteries to Protestantism.  A Court Procedures Order was enacted in 1544, to regulate legal relations in the country.  The princess also wrote many spiritual songs and an "open letter" to her subjects to strengthen their faith.

She had arranged long before that her son Eric II would marry Philip's daughter Anna of Hesse in 1554.  Eric, however, fell in love with Sidoniethe sister of Duke and later Elector Maurice of Saxony, who was also Lutheran.  At the urging of her son, Elisabeth cancelled the agreement with the court of Hesse and Eric married the ten years older Sidonie on 17 May 1545.

Elisabeth also wrote a "government manual" for Eric II, with important advice that should serve him as a guide for when he ruled on his own.

Later life (1545–1558) 
In 1546, one year after the accession of her son Eric II, Elisabeth married Count Poppo XII of Henneberg (1513–1574), a younger brother of the husband of her eldest daughter.  She retained the regency over her wittum Münden.

With great concern she watched her son revert to Catholicism, hoping for opportunities at the imperial court.  In 1548, he accepted the Augsburg Interim.  He went as far as arresting the reformers Anton Corvinus and Walter Hoiker, who, together with 140 other pastors, had vehemently objected to the Interim at the 1549 synod in Münden.  Corvinus and Hoiker were held prisoner at Calenberg Castle from 1549 to 1522.

In 1550, Elisabeth managed to marry her daughter Anna Marie to the 40-year-older Duke Albert of Prussia, with whom she had conducted a friendly correspondence for many years.  In the marriage book, she wrote some important advice for Anna Marie on her upcoming married state.

After the Battle of Sievershausen, in 1533, Elisabeth was expelled from Münden by Duke Henry the Younger of  Brunswick-Wolfenbüttel, the nephew of her late husband.  She fled to Hannover.  In 1555, she moved to Ilmenau in the County of Henneberg, in the modern-day Thuringia, where she took up the pen once more and wrote a book of consolation for widows that they should help them in their grief.

She had to watch with horror when her son Eric II in 1557 married her youngest daughter, the Lutheran Catherine, to the Catholic High Burgrave William of Rosenberg, to provide for her economically.  When Elisabeth completed the difficult journey to Münden to attend the wedding, she found that Eric had deliberately given her the wrong date and that the marriage had taken place some time earlier.  After the announcement of the marriage contract, Elisabeth was surprised to learn that Catherine would retain her Lutheran faith and would employ her own Lutheran pastor at court.

Elisabeth died a year later, in 1558, in Ilmenau, apparently completely exhausted and with a "broken heart."  Her children commissioned an epitaph with her portrait by the sculptor Sigmund Linger from Innsbruck, which was erected in 1566 in the St. Giles Chapel of the St. John's Church in Schleusingen.

Issue 
From her first marriage, to Eric I of Brunswick-Göttingen-Calenberg, Elisabeth had a son and three daughters:

 Elisabeth (born: 8 April 1526; died: 19 August 1566), married in 1543 to Count George Ernest of Henneberg (1511–1583)
 Eric II, Duke of Brunswick-Calenberg (born: 10 August 1528; died: 17 November 1584)
 married firstly, in 1545, Sidonie of Saxony (born: 8 March 1518; died: 4 January 1575), daughter of Duke Henry IV of Saxony and Catherine of Mecklenburg
 married secondly, in 1576 Dorothea of Lorraine (born: 24 August 1545; died: 2 June 1621), daughter of Francis I of Lorraine and Christina of Denmark
 Anna Maria (born: 23 April 1532; died: 20 March 1568)
 married in 1550 with Duke Albert the Elder of Prussia (1490-1568)
 Catherine (born: 1534; died: 10 May 1559)
 married in 1557 with William of Rosenberg, High Burgrave of Bohemia (1535-1592)

Ancestors

Footnotes

Archives 
 City Archiv Göttingen: Acta religionis et reformationis
 Main State Archive Hannover: Sign. Cal. Br. Archiv
 City Archive Langenhagen: Sammlung Herzogin Elisabeth von Calenberg

Works by Elisabeth of Brandenburg
 Ein Sendbrief an ihre Untertanen, printed: Hannover, 1544
 Regierungshandbuch für ihren Sohn Erich II, 1545
 Mütterlicher Unterricht (Ehestandsbuch) für Anna Maria. 1550
 Trostbuch für Witwen, 1555, printed: 1556 Second edition, Leipzig, 1598
 Elisabeth von Braunschweig-Lüneburg und Albrecht von Preußen. Ein Fürstenbriefwechsel der Reformationszeit, ed. von Ingeborg Mengel, Göttingen, 1954; second unchanged edition: Göttingen, 2001,

Collected by other authors 
Elisabeth also wrote numerous hymns and prayers, some of which are included in:
 Iwan Franz: Elisabeth von Kalenberg-Göttingen als Liederdichterin, in: Zeitschrift des Verein für niedersächsische Geschichte, 1872, pp. 183–195.
 Eduard Freiherr von der Goltz: Lieder der Herzogin Elisabeth von Braunschweig-Lüneburg, in: Zeitschrift der Gesellschaft für niedersächsische Kirchengeschichte, issue 19 1914, p. 147–208.
 Katharina Schridde CCR Sr. and Katharina Talkne,: Mit Lust und Liebe. Das Elisabeth-Brevier, Lutherisches Verlagshaus, 2009,

References about Elisabeth of Brandenburg
 Albert Brauch: Die Verwaltung des Territoriums Calenberg-Göttingen während der Regentschaft der Herzogin Elisabeth (1540–1546), thesis, Hamburg, 1921, Lax Verlag, Hildesheim, 1930
 Adolf Brenneke: Herzogin Elisabeth von Braunschweig-Lüneburg. Die hannoversche Reformationsfürstin als Persönlichkeit, in: Zeitschrift der Gesellschaft für niedersächsische Kirchengeschichte, issue 38, 1933, p. 152–168.
 Sonja Domröse: Frauen der Reformationszeit, Gelehrt, mutig und glaubensfest, Vandenhoeck & Ruprecht, Göttingen, 2010, 
 A. Kurs: Elisabeth, Herzogin von Braunschweig-Calenberg, Halle an der Saale, 1891
 Hans Liederwald: Die Ehe des Grafen Poppo von Henneberg mit Elisabeth, in: Neue Beiträge zur Geschichte dt. Altertums, issue 36, 1931, pp. 37–88
 Andrea Lilienthal: Die Fürstin und die Macht. Welfische Herzoginnen im 16. Jahrhundert: Elisabeth, Sidonia, Sophia = Quellen und Darstellungen zur Geschichte Niedersachsens, vol. 127, Hahnsche Buchhandlung, Hannover, 2007
 Inge Mager: Elisabeth von Brandenburg – Sidonie von Sachsen. Zwei Frauenschicksale im Kontext der Reformation von Calenberg-Göttingen, in: 450 Jahre Reformation im Calenberger Land, edited by the Ev.-luth. Kirchenkreis Laatzen-Pattensen, 1992, pp. 23–32
 Ingeborg Klettke-Mengel: Elisabeth von Braunschweig-Lüneburg als reformatorische Christin, in: Jahrbuch der Gesellschaft für niedersächsische Kirchengeschichte, vol. 56, 1958, pp. 1–16.
 Dies: Elisabeth, Herzogin von Braunschweig-Lüneburg (Calenberg) 1510–1558, in: Neue Deutsche Biographie, vol. 4 1959, pp. 443–444.
 Ernst-August Nebig: Elisabeth Herzogin von Calenberg. Regentin, Reformatorin, Schriftstellerin, MatrixMedia Verlag, Göttingen, 2006, 
 Heinrich Wilhelm Rotermund: Von den Verdiensten der Herzogin Elisabeth um die Ausbreitung der evangelischen Lehre in den Fuerstenthuemern Calenberg und Grubenhagen, in: Hannoversches Magazin, vol. 75/76, 1819, pp. 1189–1206.
 Paul Tschackert: Herzogin Elisabeth, geb. Markgräfin von Brandenburg. Die erste Schriftstellerin aus dem Hause Brandenburg und aus dem braunschweigischem Hause. Ihr Lebensgang und ihre Werke, in: Hohenzollern-Jahrbuch, vol. 3, 1899, pp. 49–65 Online
 Merry Wiesner: Herzogin Elisabeth von Braunschweig-Lüneburg (1510–1558), in: Kerstin Merkel and Heide Wunder (eds.): Deutsche Frauen der frühen Neuzeit, Darmstadt, 2000, pp. 39–48, 
 Eleonore Dehnerdt: Die Reformatorin: Elisabeth von Calenberg, SCM Hänssler, 2010,

External links 

 Literature by or about Elizabeth of Brandenburg in the Herzog August Bibliothek Wolfenbüttel

 diglib.hab.de Elisabeth von Braunschweig-Lüneburg: Der Widwen Handbüchlein / Durch eine Hocherleuchte Fürstliche Widwe/ vor vielen Jahren selbst beschrieben und verfasset […], Leipzig, 1598.  Well-preserved copy of the printed booklet Witwentrostbüchleins owned by the Herzog August Library Wolfenbüttel. 
 Presentation of Eisabeth's biography by Sigrid Maier-Knapp-Herbst (PDF; 58 kB) 
 herzogin-elisabeth.de Information about the Duchess and about activities related to the anniversary years of 2008 and 2010 in her residence Münden
 The inventory of books by Elizabeth Calenberg: Edition and notes, Herzog August Library, Wolfenbüttel, 2011, edited by Eva Schlotheuber and Gabriele Haug-Moritz

Duchesses of Brunswick-Lüneburg
German countesses
House of Hohenzollern
People from Ilmenau
16th-century German people
1510 births
1558 deaths
16th-century women rulers
Daughters of monarchs
People of the Protestant Reformation